Heinz Wittig (3 March 1938 – 15 August 2012) was a German water polo player. He competed in the men's tournament at the 1964 Summer Olympics.

References

1938 births
2012 deaths
German male water polo players
Olympic water polo players of the United Team of Germany
Water polo players at the 1964 Summer Olympics
Sportspeople from Halle (Saale)